Susan G. Golding (born August 18, 1945) is an American Republican politician from California, best known as the former two-term mayor of San Diego. She is currently president and CEO of the Child Abuse Prevention Foundation in San Diego. and formerly president and CEO of the Golding Group, a strategy consulting firm and a Senior Fellow of Public Policy at the University of California at Los Angeles. She also serves on the boards and advisory committees of several organizations, including the Pacific Council on International Policy and the International Republican Institute.

Personal life
Golding was born in Muskogee, Oklahoma, and grew up in Lafayette and Indianapolis, Indiana. She earned a B.A. in Government & International Relations from Carleton College, and a M.A. from Columbia University. Her father, Brage Golding, was president of San Diego State University from 1972 to 1977, then became president of Kent State University until 1982.

Susan Golding married Stanley D. Prowse, an attorney. They moved to Atlanta, where she was a college instructor at Emory University. In 1974 they moved to California and she was Associate Publisher of NewsPress, a community newspaper. After they divorced, Golding raised her two children, Samuel and Vanessa, as a single mother under her maiden name.

On July 22, 1984, Susan Golding married Dick Silberman, a financier and prominent Democrat. They divorced in 1991 after Silberman was convicted of money laundering.

Political life
Golding was elected to the San Diego city council for 1981–1983. In 1984, she was elected to the Board of Supervisors for San Diego County, California, serving 1985-1992.

In 1992, Golding was elected mayor of San Diego. She campaigned as a progressive Republican, as a supporter of gay rights, affirmative action, environmental protection, and pro-choice views. Her first campaign was a bitter one against political science professor Peter Navarro, whom she narrowly defeated. She became the first Jewish mayor of San Diego.

Her major accomplishment as mayor was to streamline city government for businesses, including setting up a "one-stop" shop for permits. She helped set aside  in the city as part of a comprehensive Multiple Species Conservation Plan. She also increased police funding and patrols, created neighborhood service centers, and helped create the city's first winter shelter for the homeless. During her administration, she was instrumental in San Diego's successful bid to host the 1996 Republican National Convention at the San Diego Convention Center. This helped soothe the pain of losing the 1972 Republican National Convention, which was scheduled for San Diego but moved under scandal.

Golding and the city council faced a problem getting funding for the convention, however. They felt it was too politically risky to raise taxes or cut services. They were accused of paying less into the city's pension fund instead.

At one time Golding was considered as a candidate for U.S. Senate or Governor of California. She made a run for Barbara Boxer's Senate seat in 1998, but had to drop out due to lagging polling numbers and fundraising difficulties.

1989 Richard Silberman money scandal

In 1989, Golding's husband Richard Silberman, described by the Voice of San Diego as a major player in San Diego politics, was caught in a money laundering scheme by the FBI. The scheme involved $300,000 that was said to be Colombian drug money. Silberman was sent to prison, and Golding divorced him. The scandal did not adversely affect her subsequent run for mayor.

The Chargers deal

In 1995, Golding helped spearhead a deal to expand Jack Murphy Stadium in order to keep the San Diego Chargers in town and attract a second Super Bowl to the city. In it, the city agreed to expand the stadium, which was later renamed Qualcomm Stadium, and add 35 new luxury boxes. In exchange, the Chargers promised to stay in San Diego through 2020.

However, the deal also contained an agreement by the city to buy any tickets the Chargers didn't sell starting in the 1997 season—thus preventing Chargers home games from being blacked out in San Diego. Opponents of the deal got 50,000 signatures for a referendum on this portion of the deal, but the referendum was thrown out by a superior court judge. In part due to the controversy over the so-called "ticket guarantee", public anger over the failed Chargers deal and the related financial losses to San Diego was still high. A city term-limit ordinance prevented Golding from seeking a third term.

Golding went to work for a San Diego non-profit, "Promises 2 Kids", after leaving her political career behind.

References

External links

1945 births
California Republicans
Carleton College alumni
Columbia University alumni
International Republican Institute
Jewish American people in California politics
Jewish mayors of places in the United States
Jewish women politicians
Living people
Mayors of San Diego
People from Lafayette, Indiana
Politicians from Indianapolis
Politicians from Muskogee, Oklahoma
San Diego City Council members
San Diego County Board of Supervisors members
Women city councillors in California
Women mayors of places in California